Gyöngyvér Lakos (born 1 June 1977) is a retired Hungarian freestyle swimmer who won a silver medal in the  medley relay at the 1995 European Aquatics Championships. She also competed in the 50 m and 100 m freestyle and  medley relay at the 1996 and 2000 Summer Olympics.

She was born in Budapest to László and Lászlóné Lakos and graduated from Ady Endre Gimnázium . Around 1997 she moved to the United States where she studied at the Purdue University, majoring in interior design, and competed in swimming. Meanwhile, she represented Hungary at the Summer Olympics.

References

1977 births
Living people
Olympic swimmers of Hungary
Swimmers at the 1996 Summer Olympics
Swimmers at the 2000 Summer Olympics
Hungarian female freestyle swimmers
European Aquatics Championships medalists in swimming
Swimmers from Budapest
20th-century Hungarian women
21st-century Hungarian women